George Furth (born George Schweinfurth; December 14, 1932 – August 11, 2008) was an American librettist, playwright, and actor.

Life and career
Furth was born in Chicago, Illinois, the son of George and Evelyn (née Tuerk) Schweinfurth. He was of German and Irish ancestry, and was raised as a Christian Scientist. He received a bachelor of science in speech at Northwestern University in 1954 and received his master's degree from Columbia University.

A life member of the Actors Studio, Furth made his Broadway debut as an actor in the 1961 play A Cook for Mr. General, followed by the musical Hot Spot two years later. He was also known for his collaborations with Stephen Sondheim: the highly successful Company, the ill-fated Merrily We Roll Along, and the equally ill-fated drama Getting Away with Murder. Furth wrote the plays Twigs, The Supporting Cast, and Precious Sons as well as the book for the Kander and Ebb musical The Act.

One of Furth's latter writing projects was a foray into an area where he had not previously explored. He wrote the lyrics for a musical revue, with music by Doug Katsaros. Furth and Katsaros shaped the work with San Francisco director Mike Ward into The End-a new musical revue. The piece was performed at San Francisco's New Conservatory Theatre Center during the summer of 2004 and was billed as a "Pre-U.S. Tour Workshop Production". The piece was reworked twice, with the title changing to Last Call and Happy Hour, respectively. 

Frequently cast as a bespectacled, ineffectual milquetoast, Furth appeared in The Boston Strangler, Butch Cassidy and the Sundance Kid (as a devoted railroad employee travelling in the car that contains the safe that Butch and his gang twice rob), Myra Breckinridge, Blazing Saddles, Shampoo (as a bank officer dealing with Warren Beatty’s character’s loan request), Oh, God! (as a newspaper editor who refuses to publicize John Denver’s character’s claims that God has communicated with him), The Cannonball Run, The Man with Two Brains, and Bulworth. His many television credits include Tammy; McHale's Navy; Ironside; I Dream of Jeannie; That Girl; Green Acres; The Monkees; Batman; The Odd Couple; Bonanza; Happy Days; All in the Family; Murphy Brown; L.A. Law; Dr. Quinn, Medicine Woman; Murder, She Wrote; Little House on the Prairie; Love, American Style; Adam-12; F Troop; and the 1980 TV movie The Scarlett O'Hara War, in which he portrayed  George Cukor. He was a regular in the cast of the short-lived 1976 sitcom The Dumplings.

He adapted his play Twigs as a 1975 television production, starring Carol Burnett. He also worked as a voice actor in several episodes of the animated television series The Adventures of Don Coyote and Sancho Panda for Hanna-Barbera Productions. 

Furth died at a hospital in Santa Monica, California on August 11, 2008, at age 75.

Awards
Furth won both the Tony and Drama Desk Award for Outstanding Book of a Musical for Company and was nominated for a Drama Desk Award for Outstanding New Play for Precious Sons.

Filmography

The Best Man (1964) as Tom
The New Interns (1964) as Dr. Phil Osterman
A Very Special Favor (1965) as Pete
A Rage to Live (1965) as Paul Rutherford
The Cool Ones (1967) as Howie
Tammy and the Millionaire (1967) as Dwayne Whitt
Games (1967) as Terry, Party Guest
Nobody's Perfect (1968) as Hamner
How to Save a Marriage and Ruin Your Life (1968) as Roger
P.J. (1968) as Sonny Silene
What's So Bad About Feeling Good? (1968) as Murgatroyd
The Boston Strangler (1968) as Lyonel Brumley
Butch Cassidy and the Sundance Kid (1969) as Woodcock
Myra Breckinridge (1970) as Charlie Flager Jr.
The Third Girl from the Left (1973) as Zimmy
Sleeper (1973) as Guest at Luna's Party (uncredited)
Blazing Saddles (1974) as Van Johnson
Shampoo (1975) as Mr. Pettis
Norman... Is That You? (1976) as Mr. Sukara
American Raspberry (1977) as President
Airport '77 (1977) as Gerald Lucas
Oh God! (1977) as Briggs
Hooper (1978) as Bidwell
The Cannonball Run (1981) as Arthur J. Foyt
Megaforce (1982) as Professor Eggstrum
Young Doctors in Love (1982) as The Patients - Disgusting Looking Patient
Doctor Detroit (1983) as Arthur Skridlow
The Man with Two Brains (1983) as Timon
Foofur (1986) as Additional voices
The Adventures of Don Coyote and Sancho Panda (1990) as Additional voices
The Munsters Today (1990) as Dr. Carver (in "Just Another Face")
Dr. Quinn, Medicine Woman (1993) as Jedidiah Bancroft
Goodbye Lover (1998) as Mr. Merritt
Bulworth (1998) as Older Man

References

External links

  George Furth papers, 1932-2008, held by the Billy Rose Theatre Division, New York Public Library for the Performing Arts

1932 births
2008 deaths
20th-century American dramatists and playwrights
20th-century American male actors
20th-century American male singers
20th-century American singers
American male film actors
American male musical theatre actors
American male television actors
American male voice actors
American musical theatre librettists
American people of German descent
American people of Irish descent
Columbia University alumni
Northwestern University School of Communication alumni
Writers from Chicago